Dorcas Jepchumba Kimeli (born 5 July 1997) is a Kenyan long-distance runner. She competed in the women's half marathon at the 2020 World Athletics Half Marathon Championships held in Gdynia, Poland.

References

External links 
 

Living people
1997 births
Place of birth missing (living people)
Kenyan female long-distance runners
21st-century Kenyan women